Skein  may refer to:
 A flock of geese or ducks in flight
 A wound ball of yarn with a centre pull strand; see Hank
 A metal piece fitted over the end of a wagon axle, to which the wheel is mounted
 Skein (unit), a unit of length used by weavers and tailors 
 Skein dubh, a Scottish knife
 Skein (fish), the egg sack of the fish eggs and/or the eggs themselves
 Skein module, a mathematical concept
 Skein relation, a mathematical concept often used to give a simple definition of knot polynomials
 Skein (comics), a fictional supervillain in the Marvel Comics universe
 Skein (hash function), a candidate hash function to the NIST hash function competition from Bruce Schneier et al.

See also
 The Tangled Skein, a novel by Baroness Orczy
 With a Tangled Skein, a novel by Piers Anthony, book three of Incarnations of Immortality
 Skien